40 Acres is the 1999 release from Caedmon's Call and made the band known to a wider, and even international, audience. The album explores the way God's redemption intersects with the places and ways people live their daily lives. The album was recorded at The Castle, Franklin, Tennessee with engineers Steve Bishir, Glenn Rosenstein, and Mike Purcell and mixed at East Iris Recording Studios - now known as House of Blues Nashville, Nashville, Tennessee with engineers David Leonard, Charlie Brocco, Mike Purcell, and Ed Szymczak. "There You Go" is on the Digital Praise PC game Guitar Praise.

Critical reception

Track listing

Personnel 

Caedmon's Call
 Cliff Young – vocals, guitars
 Derek Webb – vocals, guitars
 Danielle Young – vocals
 Randy Holsapple – Hammond B3 organ, accordion
 Aric Nitzberg – bass
 Todd Bragg – drums
 Garett Buell – percussion

Guest musicians
 Matt Rollings – pianos, Hammond B3 organ
 Phil Madeira – accordion, lap steel guitar
 Keith Rodger – electric guitar
 Glenn Rosenstein – acoustic guitar, 12-string electric guitar, dulcimer
 John Catchings – cello
 Blair Master – string arrangements
 Nashville Recording Symphony – strings

Production
 Glenn Rosenstein – producer, engineer 
 Robert Beeson – executive producer 
 Steve Bishir – engineer 
 Mike Purcell – engineer 
 Jeff Robinson – engineer 
 David Leonard – mixing 
 Ken Love – mastering

Release details
 1999, US, Essential Records 83061-0486-2, release date April 13, 1999, CD

References

Caedmon's Call albums
1999 albums
Essential Records (Christian) albums